This is a list of Swedish television related events from 2002.

Events
25 January - Anki Lundberg wins Big Brother Stjärnveckan.
13 May - Ulrica Andersson wins the second season of Big Brother Sverige.
8 December - Magnus Bäcklund wins the first season of Fame Factory.
Unknown - Håkan Windahl, performing as Tommy Körberg wins the seventh and final season of Sikta mot stjärnorna.

Debuts

Domestic
Unknown - Fame Factory (2002-2005) (TV3)

International
23 December -  Mr. Bean: The Animated Series (2002-2004, 2015–present) (STV)

Television shows
1-24 December - Dieselråttor & sjömansmöss

2000s
Big Brother Sverige (2000-2004, 2011-2012)

Ending this year
Sikta mot stjärnorna (1994-2002)

Births

Deaths

See also
2002 in Sweden

References